Ali Jalilvand was born in Tehran in 1973, and he is a civil engineering graduate from Tehran Azad University.

He began his career as programmer and then production manager in Iranian television in 1989. He began producing in the cinema and television officially after 5 years, and he is now a member of Film Producers Guild of Iran as a professional producer. He has produced more than 35 feature films, documentary films, series, documentary series, and theatres since 1995.

Filmography 

 Production of more than 20 documentary and fiction series in television
 
Production of  9 short fiction films:
 Three Generations in Mellat Beauty Salon, 1996
 Rosary of Love, 1997
 Dawn, 2000
 Mani, 2003
 Glasses, 2004
 Our Good Village, 2005
 Behind My Back, 2006
 Two Facing People, 2007
 Transcendence, 2009                      
Production 'Border Zero", documentary by Mehdi Afsharnik, 2019
Production 
 
Production of three feature films
Wednesday, May 9 by Vahid Jalilvand, 2015
 No Date, No Signature by Vahid Jalilvand, 2017

 "Below Border Zero", documentary by Mehdi Afsharnik, 2019

References 
 
 
 

1973 births
Living people
Iranian television producers
Islamic Azad University alumni